The Women's rhythmic team all-around event took place on 12 October 2010 at Indira Gandhi Arena in Delhi, India.

Final

Sources
Results

Gymnastics at the 2010 Commonwealth Games
2010 in women's gymnastics